Carty or Carthy is a surname likely to have originated from the Irish name Ó Cárthaigh (Connacht and , ; anglicised as O'Coraic). It took its current form Carty during later historical events when many Gaelic Irish names were anglicised. It has been speculated that some Irish immigrants to America and/or their descendants added Mc, changing their names to McCarty in the incorrect belief that they were returning the name back to its original form.

The Carty name originates from the south of the island of Ireland Wexford and could have been a subclan of the much larger McCarthy clan, and a member of the Clan Eoghanachta.  It has been recorded that the Carty clan was a scattered sept or clan in pre Norman Ireland which may have resulted from an event such as having come off the wrong end of a tribal dispute.  Carty settlements can be found across Ireland sometimes in locations that were easy to defend such as Sligo's Coney Island which hosts the remains of a small Carty settlement (town and beach). Carty is a common name today in the Irish counties of: Wexford, Cork, Sligo, Galway and Roscommon. It is common in Longford under the spelling of Carthy until the last thirty years.

Carty is recorded amongst the Irish travelling (tinker) community.  There may also be an English version of the name Carty which could be derived from the English name Cartwright.

Nicholas Le Poer Trench, 9th Earl of Clancarty, 8th Marquess of Heusden (born 1 May 1952) is an Irish peer, as well a nobleman in the Dutch nobility. He served as an elected Crossbench member of the British House of Lords.

Cartys outside Ireland 

In Montserrat, Carty is a common name, due to the Irish settlers on the Island, and some of the African slaves were given the name, which was a common occurrence at the time. The same is true in Anguilla, there are still European descendants on the island as well as those of African descent.

In 1873, Paul Carty emigrated with his family from Sligo, Ireland to Canada in order to take up the position of Chief Inspector of the Royal Newfoundland Constabulary. Cartyville is named after his son Michael H. Carty who went on to become a famous Newfoundland lawyer and politician.

Cartys in County Down in Elizabethan times 

According to an Elizabethan map of the 1500s, Carty was an important name in the Ards peninsula in Down in the 1500s. Little more is known of this sept at the time.

Surname 

 In Druí Ua Carthaigh, Chief Poet of Connacht, died 1097
 Arthur Carty, Canadian scientist
 Donald J. Carty, American Airlines chief
 E. Bower Carty
 Elizabeth Carty
 Frank Carty, Old IRA leader
 Germán Carty, professional football player
 Jay Carty
 John Carty (Irish politician) Mayo FF TD
 John Carty (musician)
 John J. Carty, American electrical engineer
 Johndale Carty, American football player
 Keacy Carty
 Michael Carty
 Mother Praxedes Carty, Irish American educator and religious sister
 Paddy Carty, Irish musician
 Rico Carty
 Todd Carty, Irish actor

See also

Carry (name)

References 

Carty, ó Cárthaigh at freepages.genealogy.rootsweb.ancestry.com
Carty of Hy Many clan page